ICAP may refer to:

Computers
 ICAP/4, analog circuit emulation software
 Internet Content Adaptation Protocol, a lightweight HTTP-like protocol
 Inter exchange Client Address Protocol for Ethereum platform

Organizations
 ICAP at Columbia University, a support center for support of HIV/AIDS prevention and treatment
 Institute of Chartered Accountants of Pakistan, a professional accountancy body in Pakistan
 International Carbon Action Partnership, an international cooperative forum
 International Center for Alcohol Policies; see International Alliance for Responsible Drinking
 Institute for Constitutional Advocacy and Protection at Georgetown University Law Center

Businesses
 TP ICAP, professional intermediaries in financial, energy and commodities markets
 ICAP plc, a UK-based money broker now known as NEX Group

Other uses
 ICAP Leopard 3 (yacht), a 30-metre IRC maxi yacht
 Improved Capability, upgrades to the Northrop Grumman EA-6B Prowler
 Installed capacity requirement for maintaining resource adequacy in the electrical grid

See also
 ICAAP, International Consortium for the Advancement of Academic Publication